Sukhvor-e Karmi (also Romanized as Sūkhvor-e Karmī) is a village in Heydariyeh Rural District, Govar District, Gilan-e Gharb County, Kermanshah Province, Iran. At the 2006 census, its population was 140, in 30 families.

References 

Populated places in Gilan-e Gharb County